Öyle Bir Kadın Ki (She is Such a Woman) (1979) is the first Turkish film which included a hardcore scene to be legally produced and distributed. 

The plot claims to deal with the sexual ambivalence of married couples on vacation, accompanied by a crime story. The movie started a short-lived, but intense period of pornography in Turkey until the 1980 Turkish coup d'état. Today, it is difficult to find the original, uncut version. Directed by Naki Yurter (Yani Veligradino), the lead role was played by Zerrin Doğan.

References

External links
 
 VCD cover image Warning: explicit imagery

1979 films
1970s pornographic films
Turkish pornographic films
Films set in Turkey
1970s Turkish-language films